The Alpler Torstock (2,622 m) is a mountain of the Glarus Alps, located north of Unterschächen in the canton of Uri. It lies west of the Schächentaler Windgällen, on the range between the valley of the Muota and the valley of Schächental.

References

External links
Alpler Torstock on Hikr

Mountains of the Alps
Mountains of the canton of Uri
Mountains of Switzerland